ScanSafe was a privately held company backed by investors Benchmark Capital and Scale Venture Partners,  until its 2009 acquisition by Cisco Systems. The company provided Web-based "Software as a service" (SaaS) to organizations.

History

Co-founded in 1999 by brothers Eldar and Roy Tuvey, its services block malware and secure the use of the Web and messaging. Noted as being the first to successfully deliver a Secure Web Gateway service, the company competes with similar services offered by Blue Coat Systems, MessageLabs, Purewire, Webroot, Websense and Zscaler.

ScanSafe has offices in London, England and San Francisco, California and maintains alliance partnerships with Google, AT&T, Sprint, Kaspersky, Telus, NEC, Orange Business Services, Integralis, SoftScan, TopNordic, Viatel, Ancoris, and FVC.

MessageLabs, a major provider of Messaging services ended a strategic partnership between the two companies in 2006.  MessageLabs introduced a competing in-house product titled Web Security Service Version 2, resulting in a court judgment brought about by ScanSafe which required MessageLabs to notify all prospective clients that the Version 2 service is not based on ScanSafe technology.

In November 2007, a malware outbreak on the Indiatimes website was reported by ScanSafe. Whilst the website wasn't the only victim, the attack was notable due to the popularity of the website and in the number of vulnerabilities the malware attempted to exploit. Alexa regularly ranks Indiatimes as one of the top 250 most visited websites.
In January 2009, ScanSafe reported a malware infection on the official website of Paris Hilton.

In October 2009, ScanSafe discontinued Scandoo, a free service that provided advance warning for security risks and offensive content in search engine results.

In October 2009, Cisco announced the acquisition of ScanSafe for approximately US$183 million. ScanSafe was integrated into the Cisco Security business unit. The deal was completed December 2009.

Recognition
In 2007 ScanSafe was named one of the top 100 technology startups in the world by Red Herring, awarded Best Software as a Service (SaaS) Solution by the Codie awards and won Best Content Security Solution for 3 consecutive years as voted by SC Magazine readers. In September 2008 ScanSafe were awarded CNET Security Product or Service of the Year for their Anywhere+ product, a software based filtering solution for mobile users.

A 2008 report by Gartner identified ScanSafe as a challenger in the Secure Web Gateway (SWG) market, having moved from the visionary position previously occupied in 2007. Gartner acknowledged strong partner relationships and the ability to offer an excellent solution for companies with a high percentage of mobile workers and/or remote offices, but noted the service can be expensive and that report archiving is limited.

In October 2009, IDC reported that ScanSafe holds over 30% of the worldwide SaaS Web Security market, more than any other vendor in the sector.

References 

Software companies established in 2004